Kindness Joy Love & Happiness is an album by the Great Jazz Trio; pianist Hank Jones, bassist Ron Carter and drummer Tony Williams, recorded in 1977 for the Japanese East Wind label.

Reception

AllMusic awarded the album 3 stars stating "Jones, a very flexible pianist able to excel in settings ranging from Fats Waller tributes to post-bop, keeps up with his younger sidemen and comes up with consistently fresh statements full of subtle surprises".

Track listing
 "Freedom Jazz Dance" (Eddie Harris) – 4:30
 "Doom" (Ron Carter) – 4:35
 "Old Folks" (Tony Williams) – 3:58
 "Ah, Oui" (Hank Jones) – 6:07
 "Mr. P.C." (John Coltrane) – 4:12
 "All Blues" (Miles Davis) – 8:07
 "A Child Is Born" (Thad Jones) – 7:44

Personnel 
Hank Jones – piano
Ron Carter – bass
Tony Williams – drums

References 

1977 albums
Great Jazz Trio albums
East Wind Records albums